H'its Huge '84 was a various artists "hits" collection album released in Australia in 1984 on the CBS record Label (Cat No. HUGE 001). The album spent 5 weeks at the top of the Australian album charts in 1984. On 17 August 2018, Brent James has compiled and released a new compilation using similar artwork and paying homage to H'its Huge '84, but instead calling the 3-CD set H'its Huge - Rare and Recycled". Featuring a collection of hard to get on CD tracks from the 80s.

Track listing
"Wake Me Up Before You Go-Go" - Wham!
"Miss Me Blind" - Culture Club
"Sad Songs (Say So Much)" - Elton John
"What Is Love" - Howard Jones
"I Send a Message" - INXS
"Breakin'... There's No Stopping Us" - Ollie & Jerry
"Breakdance" - Irene Cara
"Holiday" - Madonna
"No More Words" - Berlin

Side 2:
"Big Girls" - Electric Pandas
"Taking the Town" - Icehouse
"Cry" - Dragon
"Wouldn't It Be Good" - Nik Kershaw
"Oh Sherrie" - Steve Perry
"Heaven (Must Be There)" - Eurogliders
"Dance Hall Days" - Wang Chung
"I've Been to Bali Too" - Redgum
"Time After Time" - Cyndi Lauper

Charts

References

1984 compilation albums
Pop compilation albums
CBS Records compilation albums